Industrialna (formerly Proletarska) is a station on Kharkiv Metro's Kholodnohirsko–Zavodska Line. It opened on 11 August 1978.

On 17 May 2016, the station was renamed conformed with the law banning Communist names in Ukraine.

Until 2004, the current metro station, also located on the Kholodnohirsko–Zavodska Line, Imeni O.S. Maselskoho was called "Industrialna" ("Індустріальна").

References

Kharkiv Metro stations
Railway stations opened in 1978